Abacetus ater is a species of ground beetle in the subfamily Pterostichinae. It was described by W.J.Macleay in 1871 and is an endemic species found in Australia.

References

ater
Beetles described in 1871
Beetles of Australia